Oklahoma law is the state law of Oklahoma.

Oklahoma law is based on the Oklahoma Constitution (the state constitution), which defines how the statutes must be passed into law, and defines the limits of authority and basic law that the Oklahoma Statutes must comply with. Oklahoma Statutes are the codified, statutory laws of the state. There are currently has 90 titles though some titles do not currently have any active laws.

Laws are approved by the Oklahoma Legislature and signed into law by the governor of Oklahoma. Certain types of laws are prohibited by the state Constitution, and could be struck down (ruled unconstitutional) by the Oklahoma Supreme Court.

Oklahoma Statutes
Title 1. Abstracting 
Title 2. Agriculture 
Title 3. Aircraft and Airports 
Title 3A. Amusements and Sports 
Title 4. Animals 
Title 5. Attorneys and the State Bar 
Title 6. Banks and Trust Companies 
Title 7. Blind Persons 
Title 8. Cemeteries 
Title 9. Census 
Title 10. Children 
Title 11. Cities and Towns 
Title 12. Civil Procedure 
Title 12A. Uniform Commercial Code 
Title 13. Common Carriers 
Title 14. Congressional and Legislative Districts 
Title 14A. Consumer Credit Code 
Title 15. Contracts
Title 16. Conveyances 
Title 17. Corporation Commission 
Title 18. Corporations 
Title 19. Counties and County Officers 
Title 20. Courts 
Title 21. Crimes and Punishments 
Title 22. Criminal Procedure 
Title 23. Damages 
Title 24. Debtor and Creditor 
Title 25. Definitions and General Provisions
Title 26. Elections 
Title 27. Eminent Domain 
Title 27A. Environment and Natural Resources 
Title 28. Fees 
Title 29. Game and Fish 
Title 30. Guardian and Ward
Title 31. Homestead and Exemptions 
Title 32. Husband and Wife 
Title 33. Inebriates 
Title 34. Initiative and Referendum 
Title 35. Insane and Feeble Minded Persons 
Title 36. Insurance 
Title 37. Intoxicating Liquors 
Title 38. Jurors 
Title 39. Justices and Constables 
Title 40. Labor 
Title 41. Landlord and Tenant 
Title 42. Liens 
Title 43. Marriage 
Title 43A. Mental Health
Title 44. Militia 
Title 45. Mines and Mining 
Title 46. Mortgages
Title 47. Motor Vehicles 
Title 48. Negotiable Instruments 
Title 49. Notaries Public 
Title 50. Nuisances 
Title 51. Officers 
Title 52. Oil and Gas 
Title 53. Oklahoma Historical Societies and Associations

Title 68. Revenue and Taxation
Title 69. Roads, Bridges, and Ferries 
Title 70. Schools 

Title 85. Workers' Compensation

External links
Oklahoma Statutes at the Oklahoma Supreme Court website
 Case law: 

 
Oklahoma